Synelnykove is a city and municipality in Synelnykove Raion, Dnipropetrovsk Oblast (province) of Ukraine, the largest city in the south-eastern part of the region. It serves as the administrative center of the raion. It is named after the Russian governor Ivan Sinelnikov. Population:

History 
It was created as a settlement in Yekaterinoslav Governorate in the 19th century on a private territory that was given as a gift to the Russian governor Ivan Sinelnikov by the Russian Imperial government.

During World War II, since October 1941 until September 1943 it was occupied by German troops.

In January 1989 the population was 37 807 people

In January 2013 the population was 31 568 people.

Since 1979 and until 18 July 2020, Synelnykove was incorporated as a city of oblast significance and served as the administrative center of Synelnykove Raion though it did not belong to the raion. In July 2020, as part of the administrative reform of Ukraine, which reduced the number of raions of Dnipropetrovsk Oblast to seven, the city of Synelnykove was merged into Synelnykove Raion.

Gallery

External links
Website of the local council 
City portal
The murder of the Jews of Synelnykove during World War II, at Yad Vashem website.

References 

Cities in Dnipropetrovsk Oblast
Yekaterinoslav Governorate
Cities of regional significance in Ukraine
Populated places established in the Russian Empire
Holocaust locations in Ukraine